Gerardus Majellakerk (English: Gerard Majella Church) may refer to:
 Gerardus Majellakerk (Amsterdam)
 Gerardus Majellakerk (Tilburg)
 Gerardus Majellakerk (Utrecht)